Walter Jones (born February 14, 1942) is an American former professional basketball player. He was a 6'2" (1.88 m) 180 lb (82 kg) guard.

Early life
Born in  Philadelphia, Jones played at Overbrook High School, the same school that had produced Wilt Chamberlain a few years earlier. He played college ball for coach Jack Kraft at Villanova University where he would earn Philadelphia's BIG-5 Player of the Year honors 2x in a row for 1963 and 1964 and become a 3rd-Team All-American as a senior.

Professional career
In his first NBA season, Jones played for the Baltimore Bullets and was named to the NBA All-Rookie Team. The next season, he was traded to the Philadelphia 76ers where he would play for the next six years.

Jones and Hal Greer were the starting guards on the title-winning 1966–67 76ers team that also featured Chamberlain, Chet Walker, Lucious Jackson, Billy Cunningham and included fellow Villanova alum - Bill Melchionni.  Jones made the 76ers' starting lineup after Larry Costello tore his Achilles tendon on January 6, 1967. During the 1967 NBA Finals, Jones played a key role. In Game 1 of the series, Jones scored 30 points, grabbed 10 rebounds, and recorded 8 assists during a 141-135 win.

During the 1968 playoffs, before the start of the Eastern Division finals series against the Boston Celtics, news broke of the assassination of Martin Luther King Jr. Several 76ers, including Jones and Chamberlain, were vocally opposed to playing the game; however, they were outvoted by the rest of the team.

Later, Jones played for the Detroit Pistons and Milwaukee Bucks. In Milwaukee, Jones became involved in a contract dispute which saw him suspended, placed on waivers, and ultimately released. The Bucks alleged that Jones was involved in cocaine usage, even hiring private detectives to investigate, while Jones staunchly denied the accusations. Ultimately, Jones reached a contract settlement with the Bucks and was released.

Jones then joined the Utah Stars before retiring after a final stint with the Sixers in 1976.

Jones' son Askia is the third-leading scorer in Kansas State University basketball history and played briefly in the NBA himself, with the Minnesota Timberwolves.

Career statistics

NBA

Regular season

|-
| align="left" | 1964–65
| align="left" | Baltimore
| 77 || - || 16.2 || .375 || - || .728 || 1.8 || 2.6 || - || - || 5.3
|-
| align="left" | 1965–66
| align="left" | Philadelphia
| style="background:#cfecec;"| 80* || - || 27.5 || .370 || - || .744 || 2.1 || 3.4 || - || - || 9.0
|-
| style="text-align:left;background:#afe6ba;" | 1966–67†
| align="left" | Philadelphia
| style="background:#cfecec;"| 81* || - || 27.8 || .431 || - || .838 || 3.3 || 3.7 || - || - || 13.2
|-
| align="left" | 1967–68
| align="left" | Philadelphia
| 77 || - || 26.7 || .397 || - || .787 || 2.8 || 3.2 || - || - || 12.8
|-
| align="left" | 1968–69
| align="left" | Philadelphia
| 81 || - || 28.9 || .430 || - || .809 || 3.1 || 3.6 || - || - || 13.2
|-
| align="left" | 1969–70
| align="left" | Philadelphia
| 78 || - || 22.3 || .430 || - || .841 || 2.2 || 3.5 || - || - || 11.8
|-
| align="left" | 1970–71
| align="left" | Philadelphia
| 41 || - || 23.5 || .402 || - || .782 || 1.6 || 3.1 || - || - || 10.1
|-
| align="left" | 1971–72
| align="left" | Milwaukee
| 48 || - || 21.5 || .407 || - || .822 || 1.6 || 2.9 || - || - || 7.5
|-
| align="left" | 1972–73
| align="left" | Milwaukee
| 27 || - || 15.5 || .407 || - || .889 || 1.1 || 2.1 || - || - || 5.0
|-
| align="left" | 1975–76
| align="left" | Detroit
| 1 || - || 19.0 || .364 || - || .000 || 0.0 || 2.0 || 2.0 || 0.0 || 8.0
|-
| align="left" | 1975–76
| align="left" | Philadelphia
| 16 || - || 9.8 || .500 || - || .692 || 0.6 || 1.9 || 0.3 || 0.0 || 2.9
|- class="sortbottom"
| style="text-align:center;" colspan="2"| Career
| 607 || - || 23.8 || .409 || - || .800 || 2.3 || 3.2 || 0.4 || 0.0 || 10.1
|}

Playoffs

|-
| align="left" | 1964–65
| align="left" | Baltimore
| 10 || - || 16.2 || .460 || - || .750 || 2.0 || 1.8 || - || - || 7.3
|-
| align="left" | 1965–66
| align="left" | Philadelphia
| 5 || - || 31.2 || .325 || - || .682 || 3.0 || 3.6 || - || - || 13.0
|-
| style="text-align:left;background:#afe6ba;" | 1966–67†
| align="left" | Philadelphia
| style="background:#cfecec;"| 15* || - || 31.7 || .447 || - || .776 || 2.8 || 4.1 || - || - || 17.5
|-
| align="left" | 1967–68
| align="left" | Philadelphia
| 13 || - || 29.8 || .358 || - || .789 || 2.4 || 3.0 || - || - || 14.1
|-
| align="left" | 1968–69
| align="left" | Philadelphia
| 5 || - || 20.6 || .267 || - || .800 || 3.2 || 1.8 || - || - || 6.4
|-
| align="left" | 1969–70
| align="left" | Philadelphia
| 5 || - || 32.0 || .523 || - || .786 || 2.2 || 4.8 || - || - || 15.8
|-
| align="left" | 1970–71
| align="left" | Philadelphia
| 7 || - || 16.4 || .365 || - || .769 || 1.7 || 1.6 || - || - || 6.9
|-
| align="left" | 1971–72
| align="left" | Milwaukee
| 9 || - || 22.2 || .439 || - || .857 || 2.0 || 2.2 || - || - || 10.0
|-
| align="left" | 1975–76
| align="left" | Philadelphia
| 1 || - || 2.0 || .000 || - || .000 || 1.0 || 2.0 || 0.0 || 0.0 || 0.0
|- class="sortbottom"
| style="text-align:center;" colspan="2"| Career
| 70 || - || 25.2 || .406 || - || .777 || 2.4 || 2.9 || 0.0 || 0.0 || 11.9
|}

ABA

Regular season

|-
| align="left" | 1974–75
| align="left" | Utah
| 71 || - || 18.9 || .405 || .240 || .823 || 1.1 || 2.1 || 0.6 || 0.0 || 7.5
|- class="sortbottom"
| style="text-align:center;" colspan="2"| Career
| 71 || - || 18.9 || .405 || .240 || .823 || 1.1 || 2.1 || 0.6 || 0.0 || 7.5
|}

Playoffs

|-
| align="left" | 1974–75
| align="left" | Utah
| 5 || - || 9.2 || .381 || .000 || 1.000 || 0.4 || 0.8 || 0.8 || 0.0 || 4.4
|- class="sortbottom"
| style="text-align:center;" colspan="2"| Career
| 5 || - || 9.2 || .381 || .000 || 1.000 || 0.4 || 0.8 || 0.8 || 0.0 || 4.4
|}

Notes

External links
Wali Jones NBA statistics, basketballreference.com

1942 births
Living people
African-American basketball players
All-American college men's basketball players
American men's basketball players
Baltimore Bullets (1963–1973) players
Detroit Pistons draft picks
Detroit Pistons players
Milwaukee Bucks players
Philadelphia 76ers players
Point guards
Shooting guards
Utah Stars players
Villanova Wildcats men's basketball players
Basketball players from Philadelphia
21st-century African-American people
20th-century African-American sportspeople